Brownsburg is a town in Hendricks County, Indiana, United States. The population was recorded to be 21,285 residents at the 2010 Census, an increase from the 14,520 residents in 2000.  the estimated population was recorded to be 27,001 residents. In 2020 the population was recorded as 28,973 residents.

History
 
Brownsburg was first settled in 1824 by James B. Brown. When he arrived, the area was a dense, unbroken stretch of wilderness. Delaware Indians lived in what is now called Lincoln Township, along White Lick Creek, which was then called "Wa-pe-ke-way" or "White Salt".

Four years later, the first log schoolhouse was built in Brown Township. Once a stagecoach line was established along a road built in 1820 connecting to Indianapolis, more settlers arrived. William Harris settled in the area north of what is now Main Street, selling sections of woods to incoming pioneers. This gave the town its original name of Harrisburg in 1835. A post office was established in 1836 under the name of Harrisburg but was later changed to Brownsburg, since the name Harrisburg was being used by a post office in another Indiana county.

From 1840 to 1870, Brownsburg tripled in size, increased from six to sixteen acres, and added its first church. The town's first election was held in 1848. In 1863, it was divided into Brown Township and Lincoln Township.

In 1985, part of the movie Hoosiers was filmed in the former College Avenue Gym.

Geography

White Lick Creek, a tributary of the White River, flows from north to south through the town, passing just west of the town center.

Demographics

2010 census
At the 2010 census there were 21,285 people, 7,948 households, and 5,816 families in the town. The racial makeup of the town was 93.4% White, 2.2% African American, 0.1% Native American, 1.6% Asian, 0.1% Pacific Islander, 1.2% from other races, and 1.4% from two or more races. Hispanic or Latino of any race were 3.0%.

Of the 7,948 households, 40.9% had children under the age of 18 living with them, 58.7% were married couples living together, 10.5% had a female householder with no husband present, 4.0% had a male householder with no wife present, and 26.8% were non-families. 22.4% of households were one person and 8.5% were one person aged 65 or older. The average household size was 2.64 and the average family size was 3.11.

The median age in the town was 36 years. 28.4% of residents were under the age of 18; 6.8% were between the ages of 18 and 24; 28.8% were from 25 to 44; 24.1% were from 45 to 64, and 12% were 65 or older. The gender makeup of the town was 48.0% male and 52.0% female.

2000 census
At the 2000 census, there were 14,520 people, & 5,366 households residing in the town. The racial makeup of the town was 97.44% White, 0.32% African American, 0.17% Native American, 0.78% Asian, 0.08% Pacific Islander, 0.35% from other races, and 0.86% from two or more races. Hispanic or Latino of any race were 1.18%. 
Of the 5,366 households, 41.8% had children under the age of 18 living with them, 64.0% were married couples living together, 8.6% had a female householder with no husband present, and 24.6% were non-families. 20.8% of households were one person and 8.2% were one person aged 65 or older. The average household size was 2.65 and the average family size was 3.10.

The age distribution was: 29.2% <18, 6.8% from 18 to 24, 34.5% from 25 to 44, 17.9% from 45 to 64, and 11.7% 65 or older. The median age was 33 years. For every 100 females, there were 92.7 males. For every 100 females aged 18 and over, there were 89.0 males.

The median household income was $63,629 and the median income for a family was $74,245. Males had a median income of $56,240 versus $38,685 for females. The per capita income for the town was $33,196. About 1.5% of families and 2.3% of the population were below the poverty line, including 1.3% of those under age 18 and 4.4% of those age 65 or over.

Education

Public schools
Brownsburg Community School Corporation maintains all public schools in Brownsburg.

Private schools
Bethesda Christian School
 St. Malachy Catholic School Pre-K-8

Public library
The town has a library, the Brownsburg Public Library.

Notable people
Tucker Barnhart, Major League Baseball (MLB) catcher, grew up here
Chloé Dygert, bicyclist, grew up here
Chris Estridge, professional soccer player, grew up here
Arthur W Graham III, creator of first full-auto electronic race timing and scoring system; long-time Indy 500 executive race official
Gordon Hayward, former Butler Bulldogs basketball player who is currently with the Charlotte Hornets; 9th overall pick of the 2010 NBA draft
Allen Hughes, Brownsburg native and former New York Times music and dance critic
Lance Lynn, Chicago White Sox MLB pitcher, 2012 MLB All-Star selection and 2005 Indiana Mr. Baseball 
Pat McAfee, Indianapolis Colts punter, resides in Brownsburg
Tony Pedregon, Two-time NHRA Funny Car Champion current NHRA on Fox broadcaster
Bill Sampen, former Major League Baseball pitcher for three teams
Robbie Stanley, race car driver
Joe Staysniak, former Indianapolis Colts offensive linemen and current co-host of The Grady and Big Joe Show
Drew Storen, Cincinnati Reds MLB pitcher
Mark Titus, college basketball player and blogger
Kristen Ashley, author grew up here
Mike Vanderjagt, former NFL kicker and former resident
Avani Gregg, social media personality

Neighboring communities

See also
Brownsburg Fire Territory

References

External links
Town of Brownsburg official website

Towns in Hendricks County, Indiana
Indianapolis metropolitan area
Towns in Indiana